Erlebach was a village in Germany, founded in 1310 A D. It was destroyed by the East German authorities in 1986 as it stood too close to the Inner German border (part of the larger "Iron Curtain"), the border between the post-war states of East and West Germany.  It lay in the extreme south of Thuringia in the district of Hildburghausen, only a few hundred metres away from the Thuringian-Bavarian border.

In December 1986, the last family left the village. After that, all the houses were demolished and the land leveled. What remains is the village pond and a plaque on the old village site.

References

 Norbert Klaus Fuchs: Billmuthausen – Das verurteilte Dorf. Greifenverlag zu Rudolstadt & Berlin, 2009,
 Norbert Klaus Fuchs: Das Heldburger Land–ein historischer Reiseführer; Verlag Rockstuhl, Bad Langensalza 2013,  

Towns in Thuringia
Inner German border